Ali Saleh Mohammed Ali Jaber or better known as Sheikh Ali Jaber (3 February 1976 – 14 January 2021) was a Saudi Arabian-born preacher and scholar with Indonesian nationality. He has also been a judge on Hafiz Indonesia and has been a Da'i in various studies on various national television stations.

Personal life 
Ali Jaber has been devoted to reading the Qur'an since childhood. It was his father who initially motivated Ali Jaber to study the Qur'an. In educating religion, especially the Qur'an and prayer, his father was very strict, and did not even hesitate to beat him when little Ali Jaber did not pray. His family is known as a religious family. In Medina he has a large mosque which is used for the syiar of Islam. As the eldest of twelve children, Ali Jaber was required to continue his father's struggle for Islamic symbols.

Although at first what he lived was the wish of his father, over time he realized it was his own need and by the age of eleven, he had memorized 30 juz of the Qur'an.

Sheikh Ali Jaber began memorizing the Quran at a young age and later pursued formal Islamic education in Saudi Arabia. He studied under some of the most prominent scholars of the time and obtained a degree in Shariah Law from the Islamic University of Madinah.

After finishing his studies, Sheikh Ali Jaber became an Islamic scholar, preacher, and Quran reciter. He gave talks and lectures in different mosques and Islamic centers in many countries. People liked his speeches because they were easy to understand and related to problems faced by people today. He also wrote many books on Islamic subjects.

Case

Stabbing 
On 13 September 2020, Syekh Ali Jaber was stabbed by an unknown person while lecturing at the Falahuddin Mosque, Sukajawa, Bandar Lampung. As a result, he suffered a stab wound to the right arm. The suspect, who was born on 1 April 1996, Alfin Andrian, was successfully secured.

Death 
Sheikh Ali Jaber died on Thursday, 14 January 2021, at age 44, twenty days short from his 45th birthday, at 08.30 WIB from post-COVID-19 complications at YARSI Hospital, Cempaka Putih, Jakarta. Previously, Ali Jaber had tested positive for COVID-19 during the COVID-19 pandemic in Indonesia, but appeared to be recovering when he was declared dead.

Filmography

Television 
 Nikmatnya Sedekah
 Cahaya dari Madinah
 Kurma (kuliah ramadhan)
 Hafiz Indonesia
 Damai Indonesiaku
 Kultum Bersama Syekh Ali Jaber

Film 
 Surga Menanti

References

External links 
 
 

1976 births
2021 deaths
Indonesian Muslims
Saudi Arabian emigrants to Indonesia
Indonesian people of Saudi Arabian descent
People from Medina
Deaths from the COVID-19 pandemic in Indonesia